Rees Greenwood (born 10 December 1996) is an English footballer who plays as a winger for Ryton & Crawcrook Albion.

Career
Born in Winlaton in Gateshead, Greenwood began his career with local side Sunderland. He joined the club at the age of eight and progressed through the youth teams, making his Premier League debut on 15 May 2016 in a 2–2 draw away at Watford. This proved to be his only appearance for the club and he joined Gateshead in January 2018.

Greenwood joined Falkirk in July 2018. He was released on 5 October 2018 after four appearances. He scored one goal for the club, against Partick Thistle on 4 August.

In the summer 2019, Greenwood joined Spennymoor Town. He was loaned out to West Auckland Town in August 2019 and later joined the club permanently on 1 October 2019.

In July 2020, Greenwood joined newly formed UAE Second Division League side Al-Sahel, who were later renamed Lavel United. Scored two and assisted two on his debut for Laval in a 7–0 win against FC Atletico Arabia in December 2020.

In March 2021, Greenwood moved to Iceland to join 2. deild karla side ÍR.

In March 2022, Greenwood joined Northern Football League side Ryton & Crawcrook Albion.

Career statistics

References

External links

England profile at The FA
Profile at UAE FA

1996 births
Living people
People from Winlaton
Footballers from Tyne and Wear
English footballers
English expatriate footballers
Association football wingers
Sunderland A.F.C. players
Gateshead A.F.C. players
Falkirk F.C. players
Spennymoor Town F.C. players
West Auckland Town F.C. players
Laval United FC players
Premier League players
National League (English football) players
Scottish Professional Football League players
UAE Second Division League players
Expatriate footballers in the United Arab Emirates
Expatriate footballers in Iceland
English expatriate sportspeople in the United Arab Emirates
English expatriate sportspeople in Iceland
England youth international footballers
ÍR men's football players
Ryton & Crawcrook Albion F.C. players